Camelotia (meaning "from Camelot") is a genus of sauropodomorph dinosaur from the Late Triassic or Early Jurassic in what is now England. Paleontologists are divided on which family it may belong to; in the past, Camelotia has generally been assigned to the prosauropods, but this group of primitive dinosaurs is in constant flux. The genus is now considered a member of the family Melanorosauridae, which includes the first true giant herbivorous dinosaurs.

Discovery and species
The type specimens, syntypes SAM 3449 and SAM 3450, were described and named in  1985  by Galton. They were collected from the Triassic-Jurassic Westbury Formation, dating to the latest Rhaetian-Lowermost Hettangian. The fossils includes the specimens "BMNH R2870-R2874", "R2876-R2878" (holotype), with vertebrae, ribs, and parts of the pubis, ischium and hind limb. The type species, C. borealis, was first described by Galton in 1985. Dinosaurs formerly known as Avalonianus and Gresslyosaurus turned out to be Camelotia.

Description
From the fragmentary remains of Camelotia, part of the skeleton can be reconstructed. Camelotia likely had a short neck supporting a fairly large skull with small eyes. Its jaws contained many small-to-medium-sized, serrated, leaf-shaped teeth. Its hands and feet had five digits each; the hands in particular were long and narrow, and bore a large claw. The forelimbs were longer than the hindlimbs, in contrast to the more derived sauropods.

References

External links 
 Archives of the dinosaur mailing list 

Melanorosauridae
Rhaetian life
Late Triassic dinosaurs of Europe
Early Jurassic dinosaurs of Europe
Jurassic England
Fossils of England
Fossil taxa described in 1985
Taxa named by Peter Galton